Project Gasbuggy was an underground nuclear detonation carried out by the United States Atomic Energy Commission on December 10, 1967 in rural northern New Mexico. It was part of Operation Plowshare, a program designed to find peaceful uses for nuclear explosions.  

Gasbuggy was carried out by the Lawrence Livermore Radiation Laboratory and the El Paso Natural Gas Company, with funding from the Atomic Energy Commission. Its purpose was to determine if nuclear explosions could be useful in fracturing rock formations for natural gas extraction. A  device was placed at a depth of  underground, then the well was backfilled before the device was detonated; a crowd had gathered to watch the detonation from atop a nearby butte.

The detonation took place after a couple of delays, the last one caused by a breakdown of the explosive refrigeration system.

After an initial surface cleanup effort the site sat idle for over a decade. A later surface cleanup effort primarily tackled leftover toxic materials. In 1978, a marker monument was installed at the Surface Ground Zero (SGZ) point that provided basic explanation of the historic test. Below the main plaque lies another which indicates that no drilling or digging is allowed without government permission.

The site is publicly accessible via the Carson National Forest, F.S. 357 dirt road/Indian J10 that leads into the  Carson National Forest.

Following the Project Gasbuggy test, two subsequent nuclear explosion fracturing experiments were conducted in western Colorado in an effort to refine the technique. They were Project Rulison in 1969 and Project Rio Blanco in 1973. In both cases the gas radioactivity was still seen as too high and in the last case the triple-blast rubble chimney structures disappointed the design engineers. Soon after that test the ~ 15-year Project Plowshare program funding dried up. 

These early fracturing tests were later superseded by hydraulic fracturing technologies.

Gallery

See also
Project Gnome

References

Explosions in 1967
1967 in the United States
American nuclear weapons testing
American nuclear test sites
Explosions in the United States
Peaceful nuclear explosions
History of Rio Arriba County, New Mexico
Underground nuclear weapons testing
1967 in New Mexico
Carson National Forest